Kusur is a rural locality (a selo) in Kalyalskoye Rural Settlement, Rutulsky District, Republic of Dagestan, Russia. The population was 612 as of 2010. There are 2 streets.

Geography 
Kusur is located 50 km northwest of Rutul (the district's administrative centre) by road.

Nationalities 
Avars live there.

References 

Rural localities in Rutulsky District